Kharbala 2-ya (İkkis Xarbala) is a rural locality (a selo) and the administrative center, and one of two inhabited localities including Kyndal of Boltoginsky Rural Okrug in Churapchinsky District of the Sakha Republic, Russia, located  from Churapcha, the administrative center of the district. Its population as of the 2002 Census was 637.

Geography
The village is located in a flat area by river Tatta.

References

Notes

Sources
Official website of the Sakha Republic. Registry of the Administrative-Territorial Divisions of the Sakha Republic. Churapchinsky District. 

Rural localities in Churapchinsky District